Edward Pickering may refer to:

 Edward Charles Pickering (1846–1919), American astronomer
 Edward Pickering (journalist) (1912–2003), British newspaper editor
 Ted Pickering (born 1939), Australian politician
 Edward Pickering (cricketer) (1807–1852), English cricketer